Berah Mum (also Romanized as Berah Mūm and Barah Mūm; also known as Berah Mūn and Wīramain) is a village in Alvir Rural District, Kharqan District, Zarandieh County, Markazi Province, Iran. At the 2006 census, its population was 69, in 21 families.

References 

Populated places in Zarandieh County